Young Pirates are youth wings of Pirate Parties. The term may relate to:

Young Pirates of Europe
Young Pirate, Sweden
Young Pirates (Czech Republic)
Young Pirates (Germany)